A hybrid (annular/total) solar eclipse occurred on Thursday, October 30, 1845 during spring. A solar eclipse occurs when the Moon passes between Earth and the Sun, thereby totally or partly obscuring the image of the Sun for a viewer on Earth. A hybrid solar eclipse shifts between a total and annular eclipse. At certain points on the surface of Earth it appears as a total eclipse, whereas at other points it appears as annular. Hybrid eclipses are comparatively rare.
This eclipse is a hybrid event, a narrow total eclipse, and beginning and ending as an annular eclipse.

The greatest eclipse was in northeasternmost Antarctica south of where the Indian and Pacific Ocean divides at 69.1 S and 144.5 E at 23:51 UTC (9:51 am on October 31), in that portion of Antarctica and the surrounding waters it shown as a total eclipse, the remainder was as an annular, first in the Indian Ocean then in the Antarctic Peninsula.

Description
The eclipse was visible in the islands of Java, Bali, Sunda (the three compromising a part of Indonesia today) and Timor including Portuguese Timor (now East Timor), the Asian islands, almost the whole of Australia with the exception of the Cape York Peninsula, Lord Howe Island, Norfolk Island, Macquarrie Islands, New Zealand, Chatham Islands, Antipodes and some remaining small islands.

In Australia, it showed up to 10% obscuration in the south of the Gulf of Carpentaria, around 15% in Brisbane, 25–30% in Central Australia, around 40% in Sydney, 50% in Melbourne, around 55% in Tasmania and the Nullarbor Plain and around 60% in Perth, Western Australia. Elsewhere it showed 10% in the north tip of New Zealand's North Island, up to 30% in the area of Wellington, 45% in Otago. and 60% in the Chatham Islands. It was also around 90% in the shores of Western Antarctica and around the 180th meridian.

The rim of the eclipse included the area south of Cairns, Queensland, the Coral Sea and Cook Islands.

The eclipse started at sunrise in Western Australia and finished at sunset in the Antarctic Peninsula and southwest of Patagonia in South America.

See also 
 List of solar eclipses in the 19th century

References

External links 
 Google interactive maps
 Solar eclipse data

1845 10 30
Solar eclipse of 10 30
1845 10 30
October events